Navavadhu is a 1971 Indian Malayalam-language film, directed by P. Bhaskaran and produced by A. L. Sreenivasan. The film stars Prem Nazir, Sharada, Sukumari and Adoor Bhasi. The film had musical score by G. Devarajan.

Cast 
Shanavas as Chandran
Bala Singh as Rajan
Prem Nazir
Sharada
Sukumari
Adoor Bhasi
Thikkurissy Sukumaran Nair
Sreelatha Namboothiri
T. S. Muthaiah
Philomina
Santhakumari as Parvathyamma

Soundtrack 
The music was composed by G. Devarajan and the lyrics were written by Vayalar Ramavarma.

References

External links 
 

1971 films
1970s Malayalam-language films
Films directed by P. Bhaskaran